Diego Velázquez (1599–1660) was a Spanish painter.

Diego Velázquez or Diego Velásquez may also refer to:

Diego Velázquez de Cuéllar (1465–1524), Spanish conquistador
Diego Velazquez (born 2001), American actor who played Billy Thunderman in The Thundermans
Diego Velázquez, actor in Argentine films The Fish Child and The Long Night of Francisco Sanctis
Diego Velásquez (golfer) (born 1987), Colombian professional golfer

See also
Velazquez (disambiguation)